Orophia toulgoetianum is a species of moth in the family Depressariidae. It was described by Viette in 1954, and is known from Madagascar.

References

Moths described in 1954
Orophia
Moths of Madagascar
Moths of Africa